Frank Dixon Whitworth III (born June 17, 1967) is an active duty United States Navy vice admiral and career intelligence officer who serves as the eighth director of the National Geospatial-Intelligence Agency since June 3, 2022. He most recently served as the Director for Intelligence of the Joint Staff.

Early life and education 
Born in Richmond, Virginia, Whitworth is a 1989 graduate of Duke University, where he earned a Bachelor of Arts in Political Science. He holds a Master of Arts in National Security Studies from Georgetown University, as well as a Diploma from the Naval War College in Newport, Rhode Island.

Military career 
Whitworth’s command tours included Commander, Joint Intelligence Center Central; commanding officer, Navy Element of U.S. Central Command; and commanding officer, Kennedy Irregular Warfare Center.

Whitworth’s operational tours included director of intelligence for U.S. Africa Command, director of intelligence for Joint Special Operations Command, director of intelligence and deputy director of Maritime Operations Center for Commander, U.S. Naval Forces Central Command, U.S. Fifth Fleet; director of intelligence for a Special Operations Task Force in Afghanistan during three deployments supporting Operation Enduring Freedom; director of intelligence for Naval Special Warfare Development Group; special assistant for Political-Military Affairs at U.S. Sixth Fleet during Operation Allied Force; indications and warning Officer at U.S. Naval Forces Central Command, U.S. Fifth Fleet, in support of Operation Desert Storm; and intelligence officer for Fighter Squadron 31 during 's deployment in support of Operation Provide Comfort.

Whitworth’s shore-based tours included the National Security Agency as chief of targets for the U.S. Central Command area of responsibility; Navy federal executive fellow to American Enterprise Institute; senior duty officer at the White House Situation Room; intelligence briefer for the Chief of Naval Operations and Secretary of the Navy; and intelligence watch analyst at the Office of Naval Intelligence and the National Military Joint Intelligence Center.

In July 2021, he was nominated and confirmed for promotion to vice admiral. He was promoted to his present rank on July 30, 2021.

Awards and decorations

He is also a recipient of the Edwin T. Layton Leadership Award, Vice Admiral Rufus L. Taylor Leadership Award and the Army’s Knowlton Award for excellence in intelligence.

Personal life 
Whitworth is the son of Frank Dixon Whitworth Jr. and Kay Sutton Whitworth.

Whitworth married Amy Beth Crandall on September 5, 1992 in Alexandria, Virginia. His wife is the younger sister of Navy judge advocate Darse E. Crandall Jr.

References 

1967 births
Living people
People from Richmond, Virginia
Duke University alumni
Georgetown University alumni
Naval War College alumni
Recipients of the Legion of Merit
United States Navy rear admirals (upper half)
Recipients of the Defense Superior Service Medal
Directors of the National Geospatial-Intelligence Agency